Love and Mary is a 2007 American romantic comedy film written and directed by Elizabeth Harrison and starring Lauren German and Gabriel Mann. The film was produced by Elizabeth Harrison, Peter James Cooper and Jonathan Downs.

Plot
Mary Wilson, a born and bred Texan, moves to Los Angeles to open a high class bakery, and get away from her wacky family.  After initial success she faces eviction when a bad review and a run of poor sales coincide.  Hoping to raise money from engagement presents she decides to visit her family in Texas with her fiancé, Brent.  Brent comes down with an allergy before the trip and she takes his twin brother Jake, a jailbird, to pretend to be Brent.  While in Texas she falls in love with Jake, and he with her, despite some competition from Lucy, her childhood friend, who is in on the secret and assumes Jake is "available".  Brent arrives during the engagement party and take Mary back to Los Angeles, where Mary's bakery becomes a success after her grandfather gives her the award-winning recipes he and his wife collected over the years.  While setting a wedding date, Brent realizes they are not suited, Mary confesses her love to Jake, and Mary and Jake get married.

Cast
Lauren German as Mary
Gabriel Mann as Jake / Brent 
Whitney Able as Lucy
Allie DeBerry as Sara Pedersen

Release
Love and Mary premiered on March 11, 2007, at the South by Southwest film festival in Austin, Texas while the DVD followed on August 11, 2008. The film was also featured at the Hollywood Film Festival on October 19, 2007.

Reception 
Love and Mary received mostly mixed reviews with a 66% 'fresh' rating on Rotten Tomatoes.

References

External links
 
 Full production credits

2007 films
2007 romantic comedy films
American romantic comedy films
Films set in Texas
Films set in Houston
Films shot in Houston
2007 directorial debut films
2000s English-language films
2000s American films